The Cuautitlán Stamping and Assembly Plant (CSAP) is a Ford Motor Company manufacturing facility located in Cuautitlán Izcalli, Mexico. The  site opened in 1964 and currently manufactures the Mustang Mach-E. The facility previously manufactured the Fiesta. 

Construction of the plant began in 1962 and plant was inaugurated on 4 November 1964. Full vehicular assembly operations began operation in 1970, and since production began, the plant has manufactured over 2.2 million vehicles .

After extensive modification, the plant began manufacture of the model year 2011 Fiesta subcompact for the North American market. Modifications included an expansion of 25,800 m2, construction of five new lines of high-productivity presses, incorporation of 270 robots and in-line measuring systems, as well as incorporation of adjustable ergonomic platforms in the upholstery area and new paint facilities.  The plant effectively includes all major subassemblies of the vehicle body as well as final assembly.

The plant has previously manufactured the F-150, F-200, F-250, F-350, F-600, F-550, F-650, F-750, F-800, P-350, P-400, W-250, W-350, W-650, W-750, X-250, X-350, X-650, X-670, X-750, Ford LTD, Mercury Grand Marquis, Ford Thunderbird, Mercury Cougar, Ford Topaz, Ford Contour, and Mercury Mystique.

The plant has been confirmed to produce the new 2021 Mustang Mach-E electric performance SUV for global markets, including the United States.

Products

Current 

 Ford Mustang Mach-E (2020–present)

Past 

Ford Contour (1994-2000)
Ford F-150 (1991–2010)
Ford Fiesta (2010–2019)

References 

Ford factories
Motor vehicle assembly plants in Mexico
Buildings and structures in the State of Mexico